is a Japanese professional footballer who plays as a defender for Kamatamare Sanuki.

References

External links

1995 births
Living people
Japanese footballers
Association football defenders
Nara Club players
Kamatamare Sanuki players
J3 League players